Clell Lee Metcalf (25 March 1888 – 21 August 1948) was an American entomologist who specialised in Diptera. He worked on treatises on the Syrphidae of Maine and, along with Wesley Pillsbury Flint (1883–1943),  wrote Destructive and useful insects; their habits and control, a major work on insect pests, while he taught  at the University of Illinois.

Metcalf was born in Lakeville Ohio, the seventh son of Abel Crawford and Catherine Fulmer Metcalf. He studied at Springfield and went to high school in Wooster, Ohio. He joined Ohio State University in 1907 and graduated with a bachelor's degree in 1911 and a masters in 1912. With a George Emerson scholarship he moved to Harvard University and obtained a doctorate in 1919. He studied blood-sucking flies in the Adirondack Mountains and taught entomology at the University of Illinois from 1921 to 1947. He married Cleo Esther Fouch in 1908 and his son Robert L. Metcalf became an entomologist while his brother Zeno Payne Metcalf was a systematic entomologist. His major works in entomology were on insect control. His most famous work was Destructive and Useful Insects (1928) coauthored with W.P. Flint.

Metcalf was elected in 1920 a fellow of the Entomological Society of America.

Notes

References
Mallis, A. 1971 American Entomologists.Rutgers Univ. Press New Brunswick. 
Osborn, H. 1952: A Brief History of Entomology Including Time of Demosthenes and Aristotle to Modern Times with over Five Hundred Portraits Columbus, Ohio, The Spahr & Glenn Company : 1-303.

External links

 Destructive and Useful Insects (1928)

American entomologists
Dipterists
1888 births
1948 deaths
Harvard University alumni
Ohio State University alumni
20th-century American zoologists
Fellows of the Entomological Society of America